Bimbimbie is a rural locality in Eurobodalla Shire, New South Wales, Australia. It lies to the west of the Princes Highway, about 11 km north of Moruya and 300 km south of Sydney.

Bimbimbie had a state school, described as a "provisional school", between January 1899 and May 1902. It reopened as a half-time school in April 1907, but closed in March 1909.

References

Towns in New South Wales
Towns in the South Coast (New South Wales)
Eurobodalla Shire
Coastal towns in New South Wales